HSA may refer to:

Organizations
 Hellenic Space Agency,  Greece
 Haiku Society of America
 Harvard Student Agencies
 Hawker Siddeley Aviation
 Hayel Saeed Anam Group, a Yemeni conglomerate
 Health Sciences Authority, Singapore
 Health and Safety Authority, Ireland
 Hmar Students' Association, in Imphal, Manipur, India
 HSA Bank, US
 Hunt Saboteurs Association, UK
 Hospital Saving Association, UK, now Simplyhealth

Schools
 The Harlem School of the Arts

Science
 Heat stable antigen, a protein
 Human serum albumin

Transportation
 East African Safari Air, by ICAO code
 Harry Stern Airport, in Richland County, North Dakota, US
 Stennis International Airport, in Bay St. Louis, Mississippi, US, FAA airport code
 High Speed Amphibian, an amphibious vehicle created by Alan Gibbs

Other uses
 Health savings account, US
 Health Spending Account, Canada
 Healthcare Spending Account,  Canada
 Heterogeneous System Architecture, in computing
 HSA Foundation
 Homeland Security Act, US
 Sultanah Aminah Hospital, Johor, Malaysia

See also
 HSAS (disambiguation)